During the presidency of George W. Bush, several American politicians sought to either investigate Bush for possible impeachable offenses, or to bring actual impeachment charges on the floor of the United States House of Representatives Judiciary Committee. The most significant of these efforts occurred on June 10, 2008, when Congressman Dennis Kucinich, along with co-sponsor Robert Wexler, introduced 35 articles of impeachment against Bush to the U.S. House of Representatives. The House voted 251 to 166 to refer the impeachment resolution to the Judiciary Committee on June 11, where no further action was taken on it. Bush's presidency ended on January 20, 2009, with the completion of his second term in office, rendering impeachment efforts moot.

Kucinich–Wexler impeachment articles
The Kucinich–Wexler impeachment resolution contained 35 articles of impeachment covering the Iraq War, the Valerie Plame affair, creating a case for war with Iran, capture and treatment of prisoners of war, spying and or wiretapping inside the United States, use of signing statements, failing to comply with Congressional subpoenas, the 2004 elections, Medicare, Hurricane Katrina, global warming, and 9/11.

The 2003 invasion of Iraq was the most substantial portion of the articles of impeachment introduced by Kucinich and Wexler. Fifteen of the 35 articles directly relate to alleged misconduct by Bush in seeking authority for the war, and in the conduct of military action itself. Five other articles address allegations partially or tertiarily relating to the war, including the "outing" of Valerie Plame, treatment of prisoners (both in Iraq and from operations in Afghanistan and other countries), and building a case for Iran being a threat based in part on alleging Iranian actions in Iraq.

Justification for invasion

The first four impeachment articles charge the president with illegally creating a case for war with Iraq, including charges of a propaganda campaign, falsely representing Iraq as responsible for 9/11, and falsely representing Iraq as an imminent danger to the United States.

Legitimacy of invasion

Articles 5–8 and 12 deal with the invasion of Iraq and include charges that funds were misspent before the war, that the war was in violation of HJRes114, that Iraq was invaded without a war declaration, that the war is a violation of the UN Charter, and that the purpose of the war was to control the country's oil supplies.

Conduct of the Iraq War

Articles 9, 10, 11 and 13 deal with conduct of the war, including failing to provide troops with body armor, falsifying US troop deaths and injuries, establishing a permanent military base in Iraq, and creating a secret task force to develop energy and military policies with respect to Iraq and other countries. Articles 15 and 16 cover contractors in Iraq and charges that the president misspent money on contractors and provided them with immunity.

Valerie Plame

Article 14 is about the revelation of the identity of CIA agent Valerie Plame.

Treatment of detainees

Articles 17–20 concern the treatment of detainees, the "kidnapping" and detention of foreign nationals, and the use of torture.

Attempt to overthrow the government of Iran
Article 21 claims that the president misled Congress and the American people about threats from Iran, and supported terrorist organizations within Iran, with the goal of overthrowing the Iranian government.

NSA warrantless surveillance controversy

Articles 24 and 25 charge the president with illegally spying on American citizens, directing US telecom companies to create databases of citizens, and violating the fourth amendment of the US Constitution.

Signing statements

Article 26 concerns the presidential use of signing statements.

Congressional subpoenas

Article 27 is about failing to comply with congressional subpoenas.

2004 elections

Articles 28 and 29 charge the president with tampering with the 2004 elections and violating the Voting Rights Act of 1965.

Medicare

Article 30 states "Misleading Congress and the American People in an Attempt to Destroy Medicare."

Katrina

Article 31 concerns the supposed failure to plan and respond to Hurricane Katrina.

Global warming

Article 32 charges the president with "Systematically Undermining Efforts to Address Global Climate Change."

9/11

Articles 33, 34 and 35 concern 9/11, alleging that the president failed to respond to prior intelligence, obstructed post-9/11 investigations and endangered the health of 9/11 first responders.

Political views and actions
An early effort to impeach Bush was begun by Lyndon Johnson administration Attorney General Ramsey Clark.

Democrats in Congress

On June 16, 2005, Rep. John Conyers (D-MI) assembled an unofficial meeting to discuss the Downing Street memo and to consider grounds for impeachment.
Conyers filed a resolution on December 18, 2005, to create an investigative committee to consider impeachment. His resolution gained 38 co-sponsors before it expired at the end of the 109th Congress. He did not reintroduce a similar resolution for the 110th Congress.

Keith Ellison (D-MN) was the leading figure behind the resolution to impeach Bush brought to the Minnesota State House of Representatives in May 2006. Ellison was elected to the United States House of Representatives in November 2006. During the campaign and when he was named to the House Judiciary Committee, Ellison repeatedly called for an investigation into a possible impeachment. In support of his candidacy, he "received a $1,000 contribution from ImpeachPAC". Ellison would later note that his "opinions really have not changed over time, but the circumstances" regarding his position in Congress had, and he was a "step before impeachment".

At another unofficial hearing convened by Conyers on January 20, 2006, Rep. Jerrold Nadler (D-NY) called for the committee to explore whether Bush should face impeachment, stemming from his decision to authorize domestic surveillance without court review.

On May 10, 2006, House Minority Leader Nancy Pelosi (D-CA) indicated she was not interested in pursuing impeachment and had taken it "off the table", reiterating this phrase on November 8, 2006, after the election. In July 2007, Pelosi stated that she "would probably advocate" impeaching Bush if she were not in the House nor Speaker of the House.

On December 8, 2006 (the last day of the 109th Congress), then-Representative Cynthia McKinney (D-GA) submitted a resolution, H. Res. 1106. The bill expired along with the 109th Congress.

John Conyers brought up the subject of impeachment on the July 8, 2007, broadcast of This Week with George Stephanopoulos, stating:
We're hoping that as the cries for the removal of both Cheney and Bush now reach 46 percent and 58 percent, respectively, for impeachment, that we could begin to become a little bit more cooperative, if not even amicable, in trying to get to the truth of these matters.

Presidential candidate Dennis Kucinich's major point in the Democratic Presidential Debate on October 30, 2007, was that Bush and Cheney should be impeached for the Iraq War. On November 6, 2007, Kucinich introduced a resolution to impeach Vice President Cheney in the House of Representatives.

In November 2007, Joe Biden, then a candidate for the Democratic presidential nomination in 2008, stated that he would move to impeach if President Bush were to bomb Iran without first gaining congressional approval. However, no such bombing occurred during the rest of Bush's term.

On June 9, 2008, Representative Dennis Kucinich (D-Ohio), introduced a resolution, to impeach president George W. Bush, which included 35 counts in the articles of impeachment. At the end of the evening on June 10, Kucinich offered a motion to refer HRes 1258 to the House Judiciary Committee. On June 11, the House voted 251-166 to send the resolution to the Committee. The effort to impeach President Bush was not supported by House Speaker Nancy Pelosi, who believed the move would be "divisive and unlikely to succeed."

On July 14, 2008, Kucinich introduced a new impeachment resolution limited to a single count.

State-level Democratic party actions
On March 21, 2006, the New Mexico Democratic Party, at a convention in Albuquerque, adopted a plank to their platform saying “the Democratic Party of New Mexico supports the impeachment of George Bush and his lawful removal from office.”

On March 24, 2007, the Vermont Democratic State Committee voted to support JRH 15, a state legislative resolution supporting impeachment, calling for its passage as "appropriate action."

On January 2, 2008, Betty Hall, an 87-year-old, fourteen-term Democratic State Representative, introduced New Hampshire House Resolution 24 in the State-Federal Relations and Veterans Affairs Committee of the New Hampshire House of Representatives. The resolution was "petitioning Congress to commence impeachment procedures" against Bush and Cheney for "high crimes and misdemeanors", including domestic spying, illegal detentions, signing statements, electioneering, the breaking of international treaties, and war crimes. The bill further asserted that "section 603 of Jefferson's Manual of Parliamentary Practice states that an impeachment may be set in motion by the United States House of Representatives by charges transmitted from the legislature of a state".

On February 20, 2008, the bill was ruled "Inexpedient to Legislate" to pass by a 10 to 5 vote within committee, which passed the resolution on to the full House for a vote. The bill was tabled in the New Hampshire House of Representatives on April 16, 2008. After three efforts to have the bill removed from the table were unsuccessful, it died on the table on September 24, 2008.

House Republicans
On July 25, 2008, Rep. Mike Pence (IN) said that Bush had not broken the law in his own interest. He further cited the Framers of the Constitution and said that we should use "our own good judgment" regarding their intent on impeachment.

Summary of impeachment resolutions introduced

See also
 Impeach Blair campaign
 Impeachment of Bill Clinton
 Efforts to impeach Barack Obama
 Efforts to impeach Donald Trump
 Impeachment investigations of United States federal officials
 U.S. presidential impeachment
 Fahrenheit 9/11
 Let's Impeach the President
 Worse than Watergate

References

Further reading
 John Bonifaz, Warrior King: The Case for Impeaching George Bush, (2003) 
 Dave Lindorff & Barbara Olshansky, The Case for Impeachment: The Legal Argument for Removing President George W. Bush from Office, (2006) 
 Dennis Loo & Peter Phillips, Eds., Impeach the President: the Case Against Bush and Cheney, (2006) 
 John Nichols, The Genius of Impeachment: The Founders' Cure for Royalism, (2006) 
 Elizabeth de la Vega, U.S. v. Bush, (2006) 
 Charles Black, Impeachment: A Handbook (Yale Fastback Series), (1998 Reissue) 
 Glenn Greenwald, How Would a Patriot Act? Defending American Values from a President Run Amok, (2006) 
 Elizabeth Holtzman with Cynthia Cooper, The Impeachment of George W Bush A Practical Guide for Concerned Citizens, (2006) 
 Marjorie Cohn, Cowboy Republic: Six Ways the Bush Gang Has Defied the Law, (2007) 
 Charlie Savage, Takeover: The Return of the Imperial Presidency and the Subversion of American Democracy, (2007) 
 Vincent Bugliosi, The Prosecution of George W. Bush for Murder, (2008)

External links

 The 35 Articles of Impeachment and the Case for Prosecuting George W. Bush, by Congressman Dennis Kucinich. Free PDF.
 Feingold to Introduce Resolutions Censuring President Bush, Vice President Cheney, and Other Administration Officials (July 22, 2007)
 Bill Moyers Journal of July 13, 2007 "Tough Talk on Impeachment" focusing on the constitutional issues
 The Impeachment of George W. Bush an article in the January 30, 2006, issue of The Nation magazine

Bush, George W.
Impeachment